The 1997–98 Ole Miss Rebels men's basketball team represented the University of Mississippi in the 1997–98 NCAA Division I men's basketball season. The Rebels were led by sixth-year head coach, Rob Evans. The Rebels played their home games at Tad Smith Coliseum in Oxford, Mississippi as members of the Southeastern Conference. This season marked the third NCAA Tournament appearance in school history.

Schedule and results

|-
|-
!colspan=6 style=|Non-conference regular season

|-
!colspan=6 style=|SEC regular season

|-
!colspan=12 style=| SEC tournament

|-
!colspan=12 style=| NCAA tournament

Source:

Rankings

*AP does not release post-NCAA Tournament rankings^Coaches did not release a week 2 poll

Awards and honors
Ansu Sesay – SEC Player of the Year, Consensus Second-Team All-American

1998 NBA draft

References 

Ole Miss
Ole Miss Rebels men's basketball seasons
Ole Miss Rebels men's basketball
Ole Miss Rebels men's basketball
Ole Miss